Jouanin's petrel (Bulweria fallax) is a species of seabird in the family Procellariidae.

It is found throughout the northwestern Indian Ocean.

Its natural habitats are open seas and shallow seas.  It has been recorded breeding on Socotra.

References 

Jouanin's petrel
Birds of Pakistan
Birds of the Arabian Peninsula
Birds of the Indian Ocean
Fauna of Socotra
Jouanin's petrel
Taxa named by Christian Jouanin
Taxonomy articles created by Polbot